Rafael Antonio Bielsa Caldera (born February 15, 1953) is an Argentine Justicialist Party politician from Rosario, province of Santa Fe. Since 2020 he has been Argentina's ambassador to Chile.

Early life and education
Bielsa spent his childhood in Morteros, Córdoba, the birthplace of his mother. He studied at the Faculty of Law of the National University of Rosario and became a lawyer. Bielsa is also a poet, writer and essayist. He is the brother of former Argentina national football team coach Marcelo Bielsa; both are well-known Newell's Old Boys supporters. He is also the brother of architect María Eugenia Bielsa, Vice-Governor of Santa Fe from 2003 to 2007 and Minister of Habitat from 2019 to 2020.

In 1974 Bielsa began at the Federal Court of Rosario. In 1977, during the Dirty War, suspected of being a member of the Montoneros radical guerrilla group, Bielsa was detained and taken to the "El Castillo" (also known as "El Fortín") illegal detention centre, where he spent two months of questioning and torture. After a period in Spain, he returned to Argentina in 1980, and started working in different positions of the military government, mainly in the Ministry of Justice.

Political career
Upon the return to democracy in 1983, Bielsa worked in a Secretariat of the Ministry of Education in different functions. He served as adviser to the Office of the President of Argentina during the early years of the Carlos Menem administration, at the Ministry of Justice, as well as for specific international projects and other posts. He published several books of poetry during the 1980s and 1990s.

Bielsa was the foreign minister of Argentina from 25 May 2003, when President Néstor Kirchner took office, until 6 December 2005. At the 2005 legislative elections he won a seat in the Argentine Chamber of Deputies, representing the Autonomous City of Buenos Aires. At the last moment (just before the inauguration ceremony), after a request by the President, he chose not to take office, instead accepting an appointment to become Ambassador in France; however, the next day he retracted (citing moral qualms and the pressure from public opinion as the reason) and decided to occupy his legislative seat after all. Both decisions were heavily criticized by the opposition and political analysts in the media; the latter one was also qualified in harsh terms by government supporters themselves. Bielsa remained close to the President despite these problems.

He competed with fellow party member Agustín Rossi in the primary elections held on 1 July 2007, and was elected candidate of the Justicialist Party for the governorship of Santa Fe by a wide margin. He lost the main election, on 2 September, to the Socialist former mayor of Rosario Hermes Binner. Bielsa received 38.8% of the vote. After acknowledging the defeat, he announced he would also be resigning from his post as representative for Buenos Aires, which he did five days later.

From 2011 to 2013, Bielsa was the secretary in charge of the Secretariat of Programming for the Prevention of Drug Addiction and the Fight against Drug Trafficking (SEDRONAR).

References

External links

1953 births
Living people
People from Rosario, Santa Fe
Argentine people of Spanish descent
National University of Rosario alumni
20th-century Argentine lawyers
Argentine male poets
Foreign ministers of Argentina
Ambassadors of Argentina to Chile
Members of the Argentine Chamber of Deputies elected in Santa Fe
Justicialist Party politicians